Graeme James Pearson (born 1 April 1950) is a former Scottish police officer and politician who served as a Member of the Scottish Parliament (MSP) for the South Scotland region from 2011 to 2016. A member of the Scottish Labour Party, he was Shadow Cabinet Secretary for Justice from 2015 to 2016.

He is a former police officer and Director General of the Scottish Crime and Drug Enforcement Agency. After being elected at the 2011 Scottish Parliament election, he was appointed to the position of Shadow Cabinet Secretary for Justice in the Scottish Labour frontbench team by Johann Lamont in June 2013.

On 12 June 2015, Pearson announced that he would not seek re-election at the 2016 Scottish Parliament election.

Pearson was appointed as the Chief Executive of Scotland in Union in January 2017, in succession to Alastair Cameron, founder of the pressure group. He was succeeded in the post at the organisation (now known as Scotland in the Union) the following August by the former Labour MP Pamela Nash.

References

External links 
 

1950 births
Living people
Officers in Scottish police forces
Scottish police officers
People educated at St Thomas Aquinas Secondary School, Glasgow
Alumni of the University of Glasgow
Politicians from Glasgow
Labour MSPs
Members of the Scottish Parliament 2011–2016